Stone Arabia School, also known now as Stone Arabia Schoolhouse Museum, was built in 1854 in Cicero, New York.  It is significant as "an outstanding example of a mid-nineteenth century modest Greek Revival style one-room schoolhouse".  It was listed on the National Register of Historic Places in 2007.

It is operated by a local history group, the Cicero Historical Society, and is open on weekends during the summer.  Also included at the site is a historic log cabin.

It is located on New York State Route 31 just east of South Bay Road which runs from Syracuse to Oneida Lake.

References

External links

 Cicero Historical Society - operates the Stone Arabia Schoolhouse and the Log Frame House

School buildings on the National Register of Historic Places in New York (state)
School buildings completed in 1854
Museums in Onondaga County, New York
Education museums in the United States
Historical society museums in New York (state)
National Register of Historic Places in Onondaga County, New York